Arçais is a commune in the Deux-Sèvres department in the Nouvelle-Aquitaine region in western France. It is the only village which is located in the centre of the Marais Mouillé, the so-called "wet marsh" which forms the eastern half of the Marais Poitevin (the Poitou Marshes),  near the city of Niort. It is a popular centre for tourism, with several embarcadères which hire out punts and other boats for use on the network of canals that surrounds the village. There are also several shops, bars and other facilities, including bike hire.

See also
Communes of the Deux-Sèvres department

References

External links

 The interregional park Marais Poitevin

Communes of Deux-Sèvres
Aunis